Walter Leak Steele (April 18, 1823 – October 16, 1891) was a U.S. Congressman from North Carolina between 1877 and 1881.

Born near Rockingham in Richmond County, North Carolina, Steele attended common schools near his home and then Randolph-Macon College in Ashland, Virginia, Wake Forest College, and finally the University of North Carolina at Chapel Hill, graduating in 1844.

Steele was elected to two-years terms in the North Carolina House of Commons in 1846, 1848, 1850, and 1854; he rose to the North Carolina Senate, serving there between 1852 and 1858, and in 1852, he was named as a trustee of the University of North Carolina at Chapel Hill, a post he held until his death.

A delegate to the 1860 Democratic National Conventions in Charleston and Baltimore, Steele chaired the 1861 state convention which passed the ordinance of secession at the beginning of the American Civil War. Steele studied law and was admitted to the bar in 1865 and practiced law in his hometown of Rockingham.

Steele was elected to the 45th and 46th U.S. Congress, serving from March 4, 1877 to March 4, 1881. He declined to run again in 1880 and returned to cotton manufacturing and banking.

Walter L. Steele died in Baltimore, Maryland in 1891 and is buried in  Leak Cemetery near Rockingham, North Carolina.

External links

1823 births
1891 deaths
Randolph–Macon College alumni
Wake Forest University alumni
University of North Carolina at Chapel Hill alumni
Democratic Party members of the North Carolina House of Representatives
Democratic Party North Carolina state senators
People from Richmond County, North Carolina
Democratic Party members of the United States House of Representatives from North Carolina
19th-century American politicians